Sanguantang Station is an interchange station between Line 2 and Line 5 in Ningbo, Zhejiang, China. It situates at the crossing of Ningzhen Road and Minghai Avenue. The station of Line 2 is elevated while the station for Line 5 is underground. Construction of station of Line 2 starts in middle 2012 and opened to service on September 26, 2015. Station of Line 5 opened to service on December 28, 2021.

Exits 
Sanguantang Station has 5 exits.

References 

Railway stations in Zhejiang
Railway stations in China opened in 2015
Ningbo Rail Transit stations